Elledge Arcade Buildings are two historic commercial buildings located at West Plains, Howell County, Missouri. They were built or remodeled in 1913, and are two one-story, brick commercial buildings known as the Famous Grocery Building (built 1888) and the J. L. Elledge Building.  The two buildings share a common facade consisting of four one-story storefronts.

It was listed on the National Register of Historic Places in 2001.  It is located in the Courthouse Square Historic District.

References

External links

Individually listed contributing properties to historic districts on the National Register in Missouri
Commercial buildings on the National Register of Historic Places in Missouri
Commercial buildings completed in 1933
Buildings and structures in Howell County, Missouri
National Register of Historic Places in Howell County, Missouri